Busy Buddies is a 1944 short subject directed by Del Lord starring American slapstick comedy team The Three Stooges (Moe Howard, Larry Fine and Curly Howard). It is the 78th entry in the series released by Columbia Pictures starring the comedians, who released 190 shorts for the studio between 1934 and 1959.

Plot
The Stooges operate the Jive Cafe and are enduring significant debt. They reluctantly take a second job hanging posters (à la Three Little Twirps), earning a penny for each poster hung. Moe takes notice of one particular poster advertising a cow milking contest that pays $100 to the winner. Without hesitation, Moe and Larry nominate Curly for the contest, and go about looking for a cow to practice milking on. They coincidentally find a "cow" (a bull) behind the fence. Curly is no match for the wild animal, and he is quickly booted over a fence twice, then up onto a telephone pole.

When the contest day arrives, Curly (nicknamed 'K. O. Bossy') cannot squeeze an ounce of milk from the cow's udder. While fresh cows are being brought in for the second round, Moe and Larry jump into a cow costume with a jug of milk. The scheme works until Curly yanks the mock udder off the jug, and the milk comes gushing out until the jug hits the bucket, which causes Curly to be disqualified. After the contest's champion throws all of the stooges off the stage, they are left helping each other leave while being booed at by the audience because they were cheating.

Production notes
Busy Buddies was filmed on November 1–5, 1943. The film title is a play on the term "busybodies." The first half of the film's plot device was reused for Shivering Sherlocks (1948).

Curly Howard fades
By late 1943, the team had been making endless public appearances in support of the war effort. The demanding schedule began to take its toll on Curly in particular, whose childlike facial features began to show the strain. Curly had just turned 40 years of age on his birthday October 22, 1943.

See also
List of American films of 1944

References

External links 
 
 
Busy Buddies at threestooges.net

1944 films
Columbia Pictures short films
The Three Stooges films
1940s English-language films
American black-and-white films
Films directed by Del Lord
1944 comedy films
American comedy short films
1940s American films